Bryan Griffiths (born 26 January 1965) is an English former professional footballer. He played as a left winger.

Born in Prescot, Lancashire, Griffiths began his career with St Helens Town in the 1980s. He signed professional forms with Wigan Athletic in 1988, and went on to make almost 200 league appearances for the Latics, scoring 44 goals.

In 1993, he was signed by Billy Ayre's Blackpool. In two years at Bloomfield Road he made 57 appearances and scored 17 goals.

When Ayre became manager of Scarborough in 1994, he signed Griffiths on loan. He scored once in his five games for the Yorkshiremen.

Griffiths moved into non-league football with Telford United in 1995.

He finished his career back with his first club, St. Helens Town, in 2000.

References
Profile at PlayerHistory.com 
Stats at Wigan Athletic
Stats at Blackpool
Stats at Scarborough

1965 births
Living people
Sportspeople from Prescot
English footballers
Association football midfielders
St Helens Town A.F.C. players
Wigan Athletic F.C. players
Blackpool F.C. players
Scarborough F.C. players
Telford United F.C. players
Morecambe F.C. players
Southport F.C. players
Pilkington F.C. players
English Football League players
National League (English football) players